Sir Kenneth George Illtyd Jones (26 May 1921 – 12 July 2004) was a British barrister and High Court judge.

As a barrister, he was best known for his successful prosecution of the Kray twins.

References 

 https://www.thetimes.co.uk/article/sir-kenneth-jones-6brp3gcz90w
 https://www.theguardian.com/news/2004/jul/22/guardianobituaries

Welsh King's Counsel
2004 deaths
Knights Bachelor
Queen's Bench Division judges
Welsh barristers
Alumni of University College, Oxford
Shropshire Yeomanry officers